The 2022–23 Stony Brook Seawolves men's basketball team represented Stony Brook University in the 2022–23 NCAA Division I men's basketball season. The Seawolves, led by fourth-year head coach Geno Ford, played their home games at the Island Federal Arena in Stony Brook, New York as first-year members of the Colonial Athletic Association.

Previous season
The Seawolves finished the 2021–22 season 18–13, 10–8 in America East play to finish in a tie for third place. Due to the team's impending move to the Colonial Athletic Association, the school was barred from participating in the America East tournament.

Roster

Schedule and results

|-
!colspan=12 style=| Non-conference regular season

|-
!colspan=12 style=| CAA regular season

|-
!colspan=12 style=| CAA tournament

Sources

References

Stony Brook Seawolves men's basketball seasons
Stony Brook Seawolves
Stony Brook Seawolves men's basketball
Stony Brook Seawolves men's basketball